Chile España is an underground metro station of Line 3 of the Santiago Metro network, in Santiago, Chile. It is an underground, between the Ñuñoa and Villa Frei stations on Line 3. It is located at the intersection of Irarrázaval Avenue with Chile España Avenue. The station was opened on 22 January 2019 as part of the inaugural section of the line, from Los Libertadores to Fernando Castillo Velasco.

It is expected that by the year 2030 it will become a combination station with the future Line 8.

Etymology
The station takes its name directly from the intersection where it is located, Irarrázaval Avenue with Chile-Spain Avenue in the municipality of Ñuñoa. At first its name was "Plaza Armenia", because it will be under the square of the same name.

References

External links 
Metro de Santiago website (in Spanish)

Santiago Metro stations
Railway stations opened in 2019
Santiago Metro Line 3